Ruben Ribeiro (25 May 1911 – 2 February 1986) was a Brazilian equestrian. He competed in two events at the 1948 Summer Olympics.

References

External links
 

1911 births
1986 deaths
Brazilian male equestrians
Olympic equestrians of Brazil
Equestrians at the 1948 Summer Olympics
Place of birth missing